The Measure of Your Passage is a Canadian documentary film, directed by Esther Valiquette and released in 1992. Inspired by her own diagnosis with HIV/AIDS a few years earlier, the essay film presents her thoughts on the meaning of life, and the traces we leave behind after death, through the prism of the collapse of ancient Minoan civilization.

Valiquette narrated the French version of the film herself, while the English version was narrated by actress Lynne Adams.

The film won the award for Best Short Film at the 1993 Rendez-vous Québec Cinéma, and the Genie Award for Best Short Documentary at the 14th Genie Awards in 1993.

Valiquette died of AIDS on September 8, 1994.

References

External links
 
 The Measure of Your Passage at the National Film Board of Canada

1992 films
1992 documentary films
Canadian short documentary films
Documentary films about HIV/AIDS
Best Short Documentary Film Genie and Canadian Screen Award winners
National Film Board of Canada documentaries
National Film Board of Canada short films
French-language Canadian films
HIV/AIDS in Canadian films
1990s Canadian films